The Carlos Palanca Memorial Awards for Literature winners in 1968 (rank, title of winning entry, name of author).


English division
Short story
First prize: "All About Me" by Elsa M. Coscolluela
Second prize: "Kulasising Hari" by Edilberto K. Tiempo
Third prize: "The Hill of Samuel" by Alfred A. Yuson

Poetry
First prize: "The Quiver and the Fear" by Burce Bunao
Second prize: "The Cave and Other Poems" by Cirilo F. Bautista
Third prize: "Having a Drink of Water from a Broken Fire Hydrant..." by Emmanuel Torres

One-act play
First prize: "A Second Generation" by Nestor Torre Jr.
Second prize: "The Corruptibles" by Mar B. Arcega
Third prize: "Knitting Straw" by Estrella D. Alfon

Filipino (Tagalog) division
Short story in Filipino
First prize: "Anay" by Epifanio San Juan Jr.
Second prize: "Si Boy Nicolas" by Pedro L. Ricarte
Third prize: "Himagsik ni Emmanuel Lazaro" by Domingo Landicho

Poetry in Filipino
First prize: "Mga Ibon at Iba pang Tula" by Bienvenido Ramos
Second prize: "Ito ba Ang Kabihasnan" by Victor Fernandez
Third prize: "Kaktus ng Bungo" by Martin D. Pantaleon

One-act play in Filipino
First prize: "Makapaghihintay ang Amerika" by Dionisio S. Salazar
Second prize: "Bubungang Lata" by Agapito M. Joaquin
Third prize: "Sa Kuko ng Agila" by Lazaro R. Banag Jr.

More winners by year

References
 

1968
1968 literary awards